Dean Hopkins (born June 6, 1959) is a Canadian former professional ice hockey right winger. He played in the National Hockey League with the Los Angeles Kings, Edmonton Oilers, and Quebec Nordiques between 1979 and 1989.

Playing career
Dean Hopkins started off his junior career with the 1974–75 Owen Sound Greys of the Mid-Ontario Junior B Hockey League, moving on to the Ontario Hockey League's London Knights from 1975 until 1979. He was drafted 29th overall by the Los Angeles Kings in the second round of the 1979 NHL Entry Draft and spent most of the next four seasons with Los Angeles. Over the next eight seasons, Hopkins played in various minor league cities, but also managed short stops with the Edmonton Oilers and Quebec Nordiques. Hopkins played senior hockey with the Durham Huskies and also had a brief coaching stint in the American Hockey League.

Career statistics

Regular season and playoffs

External links

1959 births
Living people
Canadian ice hockey right wingers
Edmonton Oilers players
Halifax Citadels players
Los Angeles Kings draft picks
Los Angeles Kings players
London Knights players
New Haven Nighthawks players
Nova Scotia Oilers players
People from Cobourg
Quebec Nordiques players